Agnibesa is a genus of moths in the family Geometridae.

Species
Agnibesa pictaria (Moore, 1888)
Agnibesa pleopictaria Xue, 1999
Agnibesa plumbeolineata (Hampson, 1895)
Agnibesa punctilinearia (Leech, 1897)
Agnibesa recurvilineata Moore, 1888
Agnibesa venusta Warren, 1897

References

Asthenini
Geometridae genera